FBK Karlstad is a Swedish football club located in Karlstad in Värmland County.

Background
Fotbollsklubben Karlstad was founded in 1971.  The club has a large youth section which runs many teams.  Among the youngsters that have been developed by the club are Sebastian Karlsson who now plays in Degerfors IF and Per Frick who is currently with IF Elfsborg.

Since their foundation FBK Karlstad has participated mainly in the middle and lower divisions of the Swedish football league system.  The club currently plays in Division 3 Västra Svealand which is the fifth tier of Swedish football. In 2009 the club were close to gaining promotion to Division 2 but lost their final match and finished in third place one position behind local rivals Karlstad BK who gained promotion via the play-offs. FBK play their home matches at the Örsholmen IP in Karlstad.

FBK Karlstad are affiliated to the Värmlands Fotbollförbund.

Season to season

Attendances

In recent seasons FBK Karlstad have had the following average attendances:

Footnotes

External links
 FBK Karlstad – Official website
 FBK Karlstad – Football club website
 FBK Karlstad Facebook

Sport in Karlstad
Football clubs in Värmland County
Association football clubs established in 1971
1971 establishments in Sweden